
This is a list of archaeological sites on the National Register of Historic Places in Indiana.

Historic sites in the United States qualify to be listed on the National Register of Historic Places by passing one or more of four different criteria; Criterion D permits the inclusion of proven and potential archaeological sites.  More than fifty different sites in Indiana are listed under this criterion, including both Native American and European sites, and two others were once listed but have been removed.  This list includes all properties in Indiana that qualify under this criterion.

Current listings

Former listings

See also
National Register of Historic Places listings in Indiana

References

External links
Indiana Department of Natural Resources, which oversees archaeology in the state

 
Archaeological Sites On NRHP In Indiana